Football is the most popular sport in Thailand. Although the professional football leagues are new to Thai people, football was introduced to Thailand as far back as 1897.  Many Thais also watch football on local and paid-cable TV. Many matches, especially those in the English FA Premier League can be watched free on local channels. Thai channels broadcast every match of the 2006 World Cup.

Football in Thailand is organized by Football Association of Thailand (FAT).

In 2007, Thailand co-hosted the Asian Cup 2007 with three other countries. This was the second time the event had been held in Thailand, the first being in 1972.

History
Football was introduced into Thailand in 1897 by the Siamese-English Students. After that Football was popular in the Royal students and the Armies. First Association football matches in Thailand was held in 1900 by the English people in Siam between Bangkok Team against Ministry of Education Team. The result is 2-2.
In 1901 student association football tournament by Ministry of Education has established.

In 1915, first official association football club tournament in Siam was officially founded. It's call "The Royal Golden Trophy". Later this tournament becomes to Kor Royal Cup. Later the first national team match has begun. The match between Siam National Team and Royal Sports Club by the English Players. The winner are the Siamese Footballer by 2-1

In 1916, King Vajiravudh founded "The Football Association of Thailand under Patronage of His Majesty the King."

The first Siamese match against National Team as long as can be founded by historical evidence was in 1930, between Siam and French Indochinese Union Team with the state visit of King Prajadhipok. The result is the big win for the Siamese for 4-0.

After the 1932 Revolution. The Royal Golden Trophy has been stopped by the Political reason as Khana Ratsadon is anti-imperialism ideology political group, the tournament replaced by The DPE Students Cup (DPE - Department of Physical Education) after 1934.

After that the association joined the FIFA in 1925 and AFC in 1957.

Thailand national football team joined Olympic Games first time in Australia in 1956.

The first football stadium, Suphachalasai Stadium, was built in 1935. King's Cup, the first football cup was introduced in 1968. And then two years later, Queen's Cup, a national cup competition, started in 1970.

Thai football competitions

Leagues and tournaments
League competitions in Thailand include :

 Thai League 1 
 Thai League 2 
 Thai League 3 
 Thai League 4
 Thailand Amateur League

(See also: Thai football league system for the additional detail about league system.)

Domestic Cup competitions
 Thai FA Cup - an annual tournament of football clubs in Thailand.
 Thai League Cup - an annual tournament of football clubs in Thailand.
 Champions Cup - an annual match between the champions of the Thai League 1 and the champions of the Thai FA Cup

International Cup competitions
 King's Cup - an annual international football competition for national teams.
 Queen's Cup - an annual international football cup competition for football club teams.

Other competitions
 Chula-Thammasat Traditional Football Match, an annual match between Chulalongkorn University and Thammasat University on January at Suphachalasai Stadium. It first started in 1934.
 Jaturamitr Samakkee a bi-annual competition of four oldest high schools in Thailand (Suankularb Wittayalai School, Debsirin School, Assumption College, and Bangkok Christian College). It first started 1964.

Youth football
Youth football is very popular in Thailand, with several competitions and clubs being active.
Bangkok Youth League provides the top level of youth football in Bangkok with a membership that includes teams from Thai Premiership Academies, such as BEC Tero and Chonburi Sharks, as well as local and International Academies such as iPlay Soccer Schools. It provides a structured, competitive environment for over 1000 players aged 6–16 years.
Bangkok Soccer League is a youth football club organised for children attending international schools in Thailand and provides regular football for over 500 kids, both Thai and expat. 555
 Thailand Youth League
 Thailand University League
 U-19 Thailand Championship

Thai notable players
 Bamrung Boonprom
 Chanathip Songkrasin ("Jay")
 Choketawee Promrut ("Choke")
 Datsakorn Thonglao ("Go")
 Kawin Thamsatchanan ("Tong") 
 Kiatisuk Senamuang ("Zico")
 Kroekrit Thaweekarn ("Kong")
 Narubadin Weerawatnodom ("Ton")
 Piyapong Pue-on ("Took")
 Sarach Yooyen ("Tang")
 Sarayuth Chaikamdee ("Joe 5 yards")
 Seksan Piturat ("James")
 Sinthaweechai Hathairattanakool ("Tee")
 Surat Sukha
 Suree Sukha
 Sutee Suksomkit
 Tanaboon Kesarat ("Tum")
 Totchtawan Sripan ("Ban")
 Teerasil Dangda ("Mui")
 Teeratep Winothai ("Leesaw")
 Theerathon Bunmathan ("Aum")
 Therdsak Chaiman ("Uncle Therd")
 Dusit Chalermsan ("Ong")
 Natipong Sritong-In ("Alfred")
 Natee Thongsookkaew
 Witthaya Hloagune ("Oji") previously ("Heng")

See also
 Sport in Thailand
 Thai football league system
 Thailand football records and statistics
 List of football clubs in Thailand
 Futsal Thai League
 Thailand national futsal team
 Thai Women's League
 Thailand women's national football team

References

External links

 Football Association of Thailand
 Sports Authority of Thailand
 ผลบอลสด บ้านผลบอล ผลบอลวันนี้ 7m 888 Livescore